Márcio Leite (born August 5, 1984 in Aracaju) is a Brazilian soccer player who currently plays for the Milwaukee Wave of the MASL in the United States.

Leite signed with the Milwaukee Wave of the then Major Indoor Soccer League in the fall of 2006.  In the summer of 2007, the Wave sent him on loan with the expansion Carolina RailHawks of the USL First Division. He played twelve games with the RailHawks and returned to Milwaukee for the 2007-2008 season. In the fall of 2008, the Wave moved to the newly created Xtreme Soccer League. However, Leite suffered a season ending torn anterior cruciate ligament in his left knee in the first pre-season game. He then spent the winter in rehabilitation and working as a coach. Leite was injured again with the same injury while playing for the Croatian Eagles Soccer Club in the annual Labor Day Croatian-North American Soccer Tournament in Cleveland, Ohio in September 2009.

References

External links
Milwaukee Wave records
jsonline

1984 births
Living people
Brazilian footballers
Brazilian expatriate footballers
Major Indoor Soccer League (2001–2008) players
Milwaukee Wave players
USL First Division players
North Carolina FC players
People from Aracaju
Major Indoor Soccer League (2008–2014) players
Association football midfielders
Major Arena Soccer League players
Brazilian expatriate sportspeople in the United States
Expatriate soccer players in the United States
Association football defenders
San Diego Sockers players
Sportspeople from Sergipe